The National Hispanic Caucus of State Legislators (NHCSL) is the non-partisan, 501(C)(3) organization founded in 1989 by then Colorado State Senator, Larry Trujillo. NHCSL today represents over 425 elected Hispanic State legislators throughout the United States, Puerto Rico and the Virgin Islands. Since its founding, the NHCSL's primary mission has been development of policies and procedures that enhance quality of life for Hispanic Communities across the country.

The NHCSL continues to be a leader in the fight for additional resources at all levels of government. Hispanics nationwide can benefit from better housing, education, healthcare, and business opportunities in both the public and private sectors. NHCSL works on behalf of State Legislators with Congress, the White House and the national advocacy community to influence and direct these important national priorities.

The NHCSL is the preeminent organization serving and representing the interests of Hispanic state legislators from all states, commonwealths, and territories of the United States. The organization's mission is to serve as a catalyst for joint action on issues of common concern to all segments of the Hispanic community; a forum for information exchange and member networking; an institute for leadership training; a liaison with sister U.S. Hispanic organizations throughout the country; a promoter of public/private partnerships with business and labor; and a partner with Hispanic state or provincial legislators and their associations representing Central and South America.

NHCSL leadership 2019-2021
President: Senator Daniel Ivey-Soto (NM)
First Vice President: Senator Nellie Pou (NJ)
Immediate Past President:  Senator Carmelo Ríos Santiago (PR)
Vice President for Membership: Representative Cesar Chavez (legislator) (AZ)
Vice President for Public Policy: Representative Juan Candelaria (CT)
Secretary: Representative Teresa Alonso Leon (OR)
Treasurer: Representative Patricia Roybal Caballero (NM)
East Region Chair: Delegate Joseline Peña-Melnyk (MD)
Midwest Region Chair: Senator Cristina Castro (IL)
South Region Chair: Delegate Elizabeth Guzmán (VA)
West Region Chair: Representative Diego Espinoza (AZ)

In addition to the leadership team, NHCSL is governed by a 17-member executive committee.

NHCSL staff 
Kenneth Romero, Executive Director
Guillermo L. Mena-Irizarry, Director of Legislation, Policy and Advocacy
Rhina Villatoro, Director of Meetings and Membership Services

References

External links
http://www.nhcsl.org

Hispanic and Latino American organizations